This is a list of Canadians who have raced in at least one NASCAR national series event.

Earl Ross is the only Canadian to have won a NASCAR Cup Series race. Ron Fellows is the only driver to have won at least one race in more than one NASCAR national series, as he has 4 wins in the Xfinity Series and 2 wins in the Truck Series. The other Canadian drivers to have won a NASCAR national series race are former driver Larry Pollard in the Xfinity Series (1 win) and active drivers Stewart Friesen (3 wins) and Raphaël Lessard (1 win) in the Truck Series.

Active drivers
All statistics in this table are as of June 7, 2022.

These drivers from Canada are competing in any of NASCAR's national or touring series, excluding the NASCAR Pinty's Series, which is NASCAR's Canadian series and consists almost entirely of Canadian drivers.

Former drivers
All statistics in this table are as of June 7, 2022.

These drivers have retired from racing or are inactive/without a ride in NASCAR in 2022.

See also

 List of Canadian sports personalities
 List of NASCAR drivers
 List of Canadians in the National Basketball Association
 List of Canadians in the National Football League
 List of Major League Baseball players from Canada

References

Canadians
NASCAR drivers
NASCAR drivers